Jarret DeHart (born October 2, 1994) is an American professional baseball coach. He is the one of the hitting coaches for the Seattle Mariners of Major League Baseball (MLB).

Playing career
Raised in Medford, New Jersey, DeHart played prep baseball at Shawnee High School. He attended Louisiana State University his freshman year of college, playing college baseball for the LSU Tigers. After his 2014 freshman year, he played collegiate summer baseball with the Hyannis Harbor Hawks of the Cape Cod Baseball League. He transferred to Howard College for his sophomore year of college. He then transferred to Tulane University for his final two years of college, playing for the Tulane Green Wave.

Coaching career
DeHart joined the Seattle Mariners organization and served as a coach for the AZL Mariners in 2018. In 2019, he served as a minor league hitting strategist for the organization.  

On November 7, 2019, DeHart was named the assistant hitting coach for the Seattle Mariners.

On November 15, 2021, DeHart was promoted by the Mariners to hitting coach and director of hitting strategy. This promotion coincided with the departure of former hitting coach Tim Laker, who declined the club's offer to return.

References

External links

Tulane Green Wave bio

1994 births
Living people
People from Medford, New Jersey
Shawnee High School (New Jersey) alumni
Sportspeople from Burlington County, New Jersey
Sportspeople from New Brunswick, New Jersey
Baseball coaches from New Jersey
Baseball players from New Jersey
Baseball outfielders
Major League Baseball hitting coaches
Seattle Mariners coaches
LSU Tigers baseball players
Hyannis Harbor Hawks players
Howard Hawks baseball players
Tulane Green Wave baseball players
Minor league baseball coaches